The Swedish Church Law 1686 was a Swedish law which (with some alterations) regulated the relationship between the state and the church in Sweden from 1686 until the Swedish Church Law 1992, as well as in Finland (earlier a Swedish province) until 1870. It replaced the previous Swedish Church Ordinance 1571.

History 
In 1663, an investigation to change the law was formally issued, and in 1682, the two suggestions were merged. Their revised proposal was adopted as the 1686 Church Law.

The Swedish Church Law 1686 abolished canon law and the Law of Uppland church charter. The state, represented by the monarch, by then the king of an absolute monarchy, was the head of the Church and thus had final say in matters of the Church, but there was to be no political administration or political bureaucracy between the monarch and the bishops of the Church. Attempts by the state to create an ecclesiastical office with political authority failed due to the resistance of the bishops and clergy.

A consequence of this was the need for every parishioner, regardless of age and sex, to know how to read, as it would be necessary to read the Bible and the catechism to pass the annual survey.

This law was in force until 1888. Furthermore, all parish vicars were also forced by law to keep a parish register and note every birth, baptismal and death in the parish.

The 1686 Swedish Church Law – with many changes and modernisations – was the standard for both the internal organisation of the Church of Sweden and its status under public law until 1 January 1993. Changes were made, for example, during the Age of Liberty, by Gustav III, through the 1809 Instrument of Government, the 1868 Church Council Regulation and the Dissenter Acts of 1860 and 1873. In the Grand Duchy of Finland, earlier a Swedish province, the law applied until the reformed church law of 1867 was passed by the Diet of Finland (enacted in 1870).

Doctrinal paragraph 
Doctrine in Sweden was defined between 1686 and 1992 as follows:

With the 1686 Church Law, the rest of the Book of Concord was added to the older formulation from the Uppsala Synod, and until 1992 the following confessional writings were valid in Sweden:

 The Bible
 Apostles' Creed
 Nicene Creed
 Athanasian Creed
 Augsburg Confession of 1530
 Decision of the Uppsala Synod of 1593
 Book of Concord

See also 

 Kyrkogångsplikt
 Kyrkoplikt

References

Notes

Literature
 Kjöllerström, Sven: Kyrkolags problemet i Sverige 1571–1682. Samlingar och studier till Svenska kyrkans historia, 11. Stockholm: Svenska kyrkans diakonistyrelses bokförlag, 1944.
 Lizell, Gustaf – Lenfvén, Edv. (eds.): Kyrkolag og ordning af år 1686 jämte dithörande stadganden, som utkommit till den 1 jan. 1928. Stockholm 1928.
 Kyrkolag in the Nordisk familjebok (2nd ed., 1911).

External links
 Kyrkio-Lag och Ordning (3 September 1686) — the text in Swedish and Finnish.

Church Law 1686
Church Law 1686
Christianity and law in the 17th century
1686 in Sweden
1686 in Christianity
Swedish Church Law 1686
Swedish Church Law 1686
17th-century Lutheranism
17th century in education